Ill Will or Illwill may refer to:

Ill Will Records, an American record label
iLL WIll Press. publisher of Neurotically Yours comics
Illwill Creek, a stream in Kentucky
Illwill (album), an album by Lake of Tears
illwill, the nickname of hacker William Genovese
UFC 84: Ill Will a 2008 mixed martial arts event 
A character in The Germs comic strip